Willie Edward McClendon (born September 13, 1957) is a former American football running back in the National Football League (NFL). Selected in the 1979 NFL Draft, he played for the Chicago Bears from 1979 to 1982.  He is the father of former Bears wide receiver, and the passing game coordinator and wide receivers coach at the University of Georgia Bryan McClendon.  Both father and son attended the University of Georgia.

McClendon was elected to the Georgia Sports Hall of Fame and was inducted in February 2015.

References

1957 births
American football running backs
Chicago Bears players
Georgia Bulldogs football players
Living people
People from Brunswick, Georgia
Players of American football from Georgia (U.S. state)